Paralebedella shimonii is a moth in the family Cossidae. It is found in Kenya. The habitat consists of legume-dominated coastal forests.

The length of the forewings is about 12.5 mm. The forewings are buffy brown. The terminal line and subterminal line are formed by dots of mummy brown with a green centre. The hindwings are orange pink with long hairs of begonia rose towards the base, mixed with long hairs of buff yellow.

Etymology
The species is named for Shimoni Lehmann, the son of the author.

References

Natural History Museum Lepidoptera generic names catalog

Endemic moths of Kenya
Metarbelinae
Moths described in 2009